Tha Carter III is the sixth studio album by American rapper Lil Wayne, released on June 10, 2008, by Cash Money, Universal Motown & Young Money Entertainment. It follows a long string of mixtape releases and guest appearances on other hip hop and R&B artists' albums, helping to increase his exposure in the mainstream. The album features appearances from Jay-Z, T-Pain, Fabolous, Robin Thicke, Busta Rhymes, Juelz Santana, Babyface, Bobby V, and Kanye West, among others. It also features Static Major, who is credited posthumously following his death in February 2008.

Amid release delays and leaks, Tha Carter III became one of the most anticipated releases of 2008. It debuted at number one on the US Billboard 200, selling over 1 million copies in its first week which made it one of the fastest-selling albums in the US. It reached sales of 2.88 million copies by the end of 2008 and produced four singles that achieved chart success, including the international hit "Lollipop" and Billboard Hot 100 hits "A Milli", "Got Money", and "Mrs. Officer".

Upon its release, Tha Carter III received widespread acclaim from music critics and has since been regarded as one of Wayne's best albums. It earned Lil Wayne several accolades, including a spot on Rolling Stones list of The 500 Greatest Albums of All Time. It was nominated for Album of the Year at the 2009 Grammy Awards and won for Best Rap Album, while "Lollipop" won Best Rap Song and "A Milli" won Best Rap Solo Performance. It has been certified 8× platinum by the Recording Industry Association of America (RIAA).

Background and recording
Lil Wayne stated that producers would include The Alchemist, Cool & Dre, Deezle, Jim Jonsin, Just Blaze, Kanye West, Mannie Fresh, The Runners, Timbaland, Danja, and will.i.am. In an interview with HipHopCanada.com, Solitair of the Black Jays stated that he and Cipha Sounds produced a track called "Outstanding", which later eventually leaked. The Runners have stated that they have produced three tracks for Tha Carter III. Lil Wayne revealed that he has a track for Eminem, which he has yet to send to him. He described this song as the "craziest". Some believe that his request was turned down, but it most likely turned into "Drop the World" on his 2010 album Rebirth.

The album features guest appearances by Fabolous, T-Pain, Brisco, Bobby V, Babyface, Betty Wright, Static Major, Robin Thicke, Jay-Z, Juelz Santana, and Busta Rhymes. MTV reported that Wyclef Jean worked on a couple of tracks for the album and that a song featuring Justin Timberlake, Nelly Furtado, and Timbaland was likely to appear on the album. However, that Timbaland-produced track did not make the final cut. David Banner confirmed that he will be credited for five tracks on the final cut of Tha Carter III, but only one is featured on the album. After the copyright controversy of "Playing with Fire", the track was later removed and replaced with another David Banner-produced track "Pussy Monster". Swizz Beatz stated he was also working on the album. When asked about how many tracks Kanye West had contributed, he answered:

Music
Tha Carter IIIs lead single, "Lollipop", peaked at number one on the US Billboard Hot 100, staying at the top for three weeks. It was Wayne's most successful solo single in his career, winning one Grammy Award, a BET Award, and an MTV VMA. The song was praised as an "electro-bumpin'...infectious track", perceived as more of a "bubblegum" pop track than rap. The second track on the album, "Mr. Carter", was nominated for a Grammy while also peaking within the Hot 100. Jay-Z's guest verse on the song was praised, which was seen as him passing the throne to Wayne. The second single, "A Milli", was a top ten hit and was praised as one of the best songs of 2008. The song garnered countless freestyles and remixes, while Wayne's original version was praised with "spectacular rhyme". "Dr. Carter", the sixth track, was also praised for lyrical content and humor as Wayne took on the persona of a doctor performing surgery on various patients (a metaphor for Wayne resurrecting hip-hop). "Tie My Hands", featuring Robin Thicke, was praised as a deep track featuring "political commentary" and "despair" with Thicke's performance being the most complementary to Wayne. "Phone Home" also features various alien metaphors reminiscent of the film E.T. the Extra-Terrestrial (1982).

Release and promotion

Leaks
After most of the album leaked on the Internet in mid-2007, Lil Wayne used the leaked tracks, plus four new songs to make an album titled The Leak. The Leak was to be officially released on December 18, 2007, with the actual album being delayed until June 10, 2008. When questioned about the unplanned leak, Lil Wayne said:

On May 24, 2008, 10-second snippets of multiple songs were leaked onto AT&T Media Mall. On May 30–31, Tha Carter III was leaked internationally. The first of the leaks were distributed on May 30 at around 8pm where five songs from the track list were available on the internet. Hours later on May 31 at 12am-1am the whole album was leaked and posted on various websites for free download. The DJ responsible for the leaks was DJ Chuck T who retaliated for an interview conducted by Wayne, where he discredited all DJs and the mixtape scene days before. Lil Wayne later called DJ Drama's radio show Shade 45 Sirius Satellite Radio to explain that his comments were meant specifically for DJ Empire who leaked his materials periodically without his permission, consent, or knowledge; he also apologized for any misunderstandings between him and the numerous DJs that have aided him in the mixtape industry. He made it clear, however, that he wished for any feelings of dislike or resentment to remain.

Singles
The album's lead single, "Lollipop", topped the US Billboard Hot 100 for 5 non-consecutive weeks, making it Wayne's most successful single in his career. It features rapper Static Major. The album's second single, "A Milli", was another top ten. It reached No. 6 on the Billboard Hot 100. It also won a Grammy for Best Rap Song. The video for the second single, "A Milli", was set to be released in May, and has since been mainstreamed. Multiple versions of the track were to be included on the album as "skit-like" tracks, featuring artists such as Tyga, Cory Gunz, Hurricane Chris and Lil Mama. Another artist, 13-year-old Lil Chuckee, was also set to appear on one of the "A Milli" skits. None of the skits made the final cut of the album. The third single is "Got Money", featuring T-Pain. It reached No. 10 on the Billboard Hot 100. The fourth single is "Mrs. Officer", featuring Bobby Valentino. It made the Top 20 in just four weeks. "Comfortable" was sent to American rhythmic contemporary radio as the album's fifth and final single on September 29, 2008. "Lollipop", "A Milli", "Got Money", and another track, "Mr. Carter", were nominated for a Grammy. Lil Wayne also performed "Tie My Hands" with Robin Thicke at the 51st Grammy Awards.

The album also featured the releases of promo singles. "3 Peat" peaked at number 66 on the Billboard 100. "You Ain't Got Nuthin" featuring Fabolous and Juelz Santana was released as a promo single, peaking at number 81 on the Billboard 100. "Mr. Carter", featuring Jay-Z, peaked at number 62 on the Billboard 100, number 27 on the Hot R&B/Hip Hop Songs chart, and number 13 on the Top Rap Songs. It was nominated for a Grammy for Best Rap Performance by a Duo or a Group in 2009.

Lawsuits
On July 24, 2008, Abkco Music Inc. filed a lawsuit against Lil Wayne for copyright infringement and unfair competition, specifically referring to the track "Playing with Fire". In the lawsuit, Abkco claims that the song was obviously derived from The Rolling Stones' "Play with Fire", to which Abkco owns the rights. Subsequently, "Playing with Fire" was removed from the track list of Tha Carter III on all online music stores and replaced with the David Banner produced track, "Pussy Monster".

In March 2011, producer Deezle (Darius Harrison) sued Wayne and his parent labels Cash Money Records over unpaid royalties from Tha Carter III album. In May 2011, producer Bangladesh also filed a lawsuit against Weezy & Co. over unpaid royalties. In early June 2011, another producer named David Kirkwood filed a lawsuit against Young Money Entertainment and Cash Money Records on claims that the labels have failed to pay him over $1.5 million in royalties and production services for his work on the album, also including his songwriting on "Love Me or Hate Me", a bonus song featured only on the deluxe edition of the album. Also in June 2011, Dallas producers Play-N-Skillz filed a lawsuit against him claiming Wayne owed them at least $1 million in unpaid royalties for "Got Money" from Tha Carter III.

Critical reception

Tha Carter III received widespread acclaim from music critics. At Metacritic, which assigns a normalized rating out of 100 to reviews from mainstream critics, the album received an average score of 84, based on 26 reviews. AllMusic editor David Jeffries praised Wayne's "entertaining wordplay and plenty of well-executed, left-field ideas". The Guardians Alex Macpherson lauded Wayne's rapping, stating "Just trying to keep up with Wayne's mind as he proves the case is a thrill. He breaks language down into building blocks for new metaphors, exploiting every possible semantic and phonetic loophole for humour and yanking pop culture references into startling new contexts".

Jonah Weiner of Blender called it "a weird, gripping triumph". Rolling Stone writer Jody Rosen commended its themes and stated "This isn't a mixtape, it's a suite of songs, paced and sequenced for maximum  impact." Jon Pareles of The New York Times commented that Wayne "has clearly worked to make Tha Carter III a statement of its own: one that moves beyond standard hip-hop boasting (though there's plenty of that) to thoughts that can be introspective or gleefully unhinged". Pitchforks Ryan Dombal stated, "he distills the myriad metaphors, convulsing flows, and vein-splitting emotions into a commercially gratifying package". In his consumer guide for MSN Music, critic Robert Christgau noted that "every track attends to detail" and quipped, "From the start you know this is no mixtape because it's clearer and more forceful." Uncut stated that "the prince of hip-hop gets a blessing from the king." Mosi Reeves of Paste gave it a favorable review and noted that the album "hearkens to when rap meant rapp: Isaac Hayes talking for days about some girl he broke with, or Bobby Womack signifying while strumming a blues guitar." Nathan Rabin of The A.V. Club called Lil Wayne "the man of the moment, but the disc's best moments strive for timelessness and attain it."

The Washington Posts J. Freedom du Lac commended Wayne for his "impulses to be outrageous and unconventional", calling him a "nonsensical genius", but found the album "uneven". Tom Breihan of The Village Voice described it as "a sprawling mess, and it clangs nearly as often as it clicks" and "a work of staggering heights and maddening inconsistencies", but commended Wayne for his unconventional performance, stating "On paper, this is a textbook focus-grouped major-label hodgepodge, replete with girl songs and club songs and street songs. But every facet of the album comes animated and atomized by Wayne's absurdist drug-gobbling persona". Drew Hinshaw of PopMatters stated "Tha Carter III is a monumental album full of powerful, self-defeating statements that obliterate rap's internal logic without offering too much more than indifferent bong logic in return. Judged, however, as a collection of singles and quotable verses—the criteria on which we've been grading hip-hop records since the end of disco—Tha Carter III is an agonizing piece of work". Jeff Weiss of the Los Angeles Times found it "scattershot", stating "When Wayne's mad alchemy works, Tha Carter III evinces shades of brilliance that merit the wild hype, but in its transparent attempts to define its era, it fails, falling victim to the imperial bloat of its big-budget mishmash of styles." Jon Caramanica of Entertainment Weekly wrote that "this schizoid album [...] is alternately mesmerizing and inscrutable." Slant Magazines Dave Hughes viewed that it lacks a "focus" as an album, and stated, "while there are a lot of [...] great moments here, Carter III is not the definitive statement of Wayne's mastery that he clearly intended it to be." Brandon Perkins of URB commented that "As a sum of its parts, Tha Carter III does not transcend, but a good number of those parts are otherworldly enough." Julian Benbow of The Boston Globe said the album was "not an instant classic, but it is the best rap album since Kanye West dropped "Graduation" last year." Eric R. Danton of the Hartford Courant said of Lil Wayne, "If his raspy, cartoonish voice didn't mark him as different, his quick wit, offhanded wordplay and quirky subject matter should have in a genre populated largely by grim-faced imitators."

Other reviews are average or mixed: Chase Hoffberger of The Austin Chronicle gave the album three stars out of five and said, "It's Wayne's personality that both floats and sinks TCIII." Kilian Murphy of Hot Press also gave it a score of three out of five and stated, "Gifted MC loses the run of himself without Mannie Fresh." Lewis P. of Sputnikmusic likewise gave it a score of three out of five and said the album "is scattershot, which oddly strengthens its faults, as if any lull in quality means that the next batch of producers can just reset the formula." (However, nearly three years later, in 2011, Alex Robertson of the same website gave the album a score of four-and-a-half out of five and said it was "sort of a miracle: it's way too weird and confusing to be on the mainstream rap charts--to be that record that everyone knows about--but it is anyway. This album was in opposition to much of modern rap but somehow became popular and then proceeded to completely consume the genre and change its direction. [...] Tha Carter III is a contradictory, against-all-odds masterpiece, and Lil Wayne may never perfect this balance again. I sincerely question: will anyone?") Ajitpaul Manjat of Tiny Mix Tapes gave the album two-and-a-half stars out of five and stated that, "equipped with the stylish, but too-often substance-less Tha Carter III, Lil Wayne seems poised to flip the script on the "rapper racists" (radio stations, MTV) by evolving into the "biggest" rapper alive."

Accolades
Tha Carter III was ranked number one in Blenders list of the 33 best albums of 2008. Christgau ranked its deluxe edition as the second best album of 2008. The album was also ranked number three on Rolling Stones list of the top 50 albums of 2008. It was nominated for a Grammy Award for Album of the Year, and it won for Best Rap Album at the 2009 Grammy Awards, while "Lollipop" won for Best Rap Song and "A Milli" won for Best Rap Solo Performance. Billboard magazine ranked the album number 103 on its list of the Top 200 Albums of the Decade. In 2012, the album was ranked number 437 on Rolling Stones list of the 500 Greatest Albums of All Time, upgrading to number 208 in 2020 revised list. In 2012 Complex named the album one of the classic albums of the last decade.

Commercial performance
With opening day sales figures of approximately 423,000 copies, Tha Carter III debuted at number one on the US Billboard 200 chart, selling 1,005,545 copies in its first week. This became Wayne's first US number one debut and his sixth top-ten album. With its first week sales, it is the largest first week sales for any album in 2008 in the United States and the first album to reach the million mark in one week since 50 Cent's The Massacre (2005). In its second week, the album dropped to number two on the chart, behind Coldplay's Viva La Vida or Death And All His Friends, selling an additional 309,000 copies. By the end of 2008, Tha Carter III had sold approximately 2.88 million copies and it was named the best-selling album of the year in the United States by Billboard. On September 25, 2020, the album was certified six times platinum by the Recording Industry Association of America (RIAA), for combined sales and album-equivalent units of over six million units in the United States.

Tha Carter III has also reached the top spot in the Canadian Albums Chart, selling nearly 21,000 units. Elsewhere, the album achieved moderate success, entering at only number 23 in the UK and number 34 on the Irish Album Chart.

Track listingNotes'''
 "A Milli" contains a sample from "I Left My Wallet In El Segundo (Vampire Mix)", as performed by A Tribe Called Quest.
 "Comfortable" contains an uncredited sample from "You Don't Know My Name", written by Alicia Keys, Kanye West, and Harold Lilly, and performed by Keys.
"Dr. Carter" contains samples from "Holy Thursday", written by David A. Axelrod.
"DontGetIt" contains samples from "Don't Let Me Be Misunderstood", written by Bennie Benjamin, Gloria Caldwell and Sol Marcus.
 "Action" contains a sample of "I'm So Hood" by DJ Khaled.
 "I'm Me" contains samples of "Go D.J.", "Fireman", "Hustler Musik", and "Cash Money Millionaires" by Lil Wayne, "God Moving Over the Face of the Waters" by Moby, and "Rubberband Man" by T.I.
 "Gossip" contains a sample of "Stop in the Name of Love" by Margie Joseph.
 "Kush" contains a sample of "Honey Wild" by Con Funk Shun.

Personnel
Credits for Tha Carter III adapted from Allmusic.

 Chad Gilbreath/SoulReaveR - producer
 Angelo Aponte – engineer
 David Banner – producer
 Joshua Berkman – digital editing
 Miguel Angel Mendoza Bermudez – mixing assistant
 Sandy Brummels – creative director
 Katina Bynum – project manager
 Gloria Caldwell – composer
 Ludas Charles – keyboards
 Andrew Dawson – mixing
 Jim Jonsin – producer
 Jonathan Mannion – photography
 Fabian Marasciullo – mixing

 Sol Marcus – composer
 Vlado Meller – mastering
 Sha Ron Prescott – vocals
 Pro-Jay – engineer, musician, producer
 James Scheffer – composer
 Miguel Scott – engineer
 Swizz Beatz – producer
 Robin Thicke – musician, producer
 Julian Vasquez – engineer
 Gina Victoria – engineer
 Kanye West – producer

Charts

Weekly charts

Year-end charts

Decade-end charts

Certifications

References

External links
 Tha Carter III'' at Discogs
 

2008 albums
Albums produced by Bangladesh (record producer)
Albums produced by Cool & Dre
Albums produced by David Banner
Albums produced by Jim Jonsin
Albums produced by Kanye West
Albums produced by Robin Thicke
Albums produced by Swizz Beatz
Albums produced by the Alchemist (musician)
Cash Money Records albums
Lil Wayne albums
Universal Records albums
Young Money Entertainment albums
Grammy Award for Best Rap Album
Sequel albums
Albums produced by T-Pain